Singles is a 2003 South Korean romantic comedy film starring Jang Jin-young, Uhm Jung-hwa, Lee Beom-soo, and Kim Joo-hyuk. It is based on the novel Christmas at Twenty-nine by Japanese writer Kamato Toshio. The film was one of the highest grossing Korean films of all time earning 2,203,164 admissions nationwide.

Jang won Best Actress at the 2003 Blue Dragon Film Awards for her performance.

Plot 
Na-nan, soon to turn 30, is at a crossroads in her life. She has been dumped by her boyfriend, then gets demoted at work from designer to restaurant manager. For support she relies on her best friend, promiscuous party girl Dong-mi, who shares an apartment with the shy and studious Jeong-joon. Eventually Na-nan attracts the attention of Su-heon, and the two start dating. But when she learns that Su-heon is being transferred to the United States, she must choose between making a go of her career as a restaurateur, or starting a new life overseas.

Cast 
 Jang Jin-young ... Na-nan
 Uhm Jung-hwa ... Dong-mi
 Lee Beom-soo ... Jeong-joon
 Kim Joo-hyuk ... Su-heon
 Oh Ji-hye
 Song Jae-ho
 Lee Hwi-jae
 Kim Kwang-il
 Han Ji-hye ... Ji-hye
 Jo Hee-bong

References

External links 
  
 
 
 
 
 Singles review at Koreanfilm.org

2003 romantic comedy films
2003 films
Films based on Japanese novels
2000s Korean-language films
South Korean romantic comedy films
2000s South Korean films